Valdemar Emil Knudsen (August 5, 1819 – January 5, 1898) was a sugarcane plantation pioneer on west Kauai, Hawaii.

Background
Valdemar Emil Knudsen was born in Kristiansand, in Vest-Agder county, Norway. He was college-trained in botany and science in Copenhagen. Knudsen was successful both as a publisher in New York City and as a merchant during the California gold rush of the 1840s. He learned the languages of the local Indians and helped them with advice in legal matters. In November 1849, he was part of the California Constitutional Convention.

Career
Knudsen arrived in Kekaha, Kauai, Hawaii in 1856. He managed the Grove Farm Plantation which was then owned by Hermann A. Widemann. The Kingdom of Hawaii contracted with Knudsen for the removal of armaments from Russian Fort Elizabeth, east of the town of Waimea. In a letter sent to Honolulu, Knudsen listed an inventory of the guns at the fort following a survey made in 1862.

Knudsen subsequently bought a 30-year lease on Hawaiian crown lands in the Waimea district where he established a ranch. He worked in partnership with ship captain Henrik Christian L’Orange (1843-1916) from Halden, Norway. This cane, of the Lahaina variety, was the first commercially grown sugarcane in Kekaha. This plantation formed the basis of the Kekaha Sugar Company.

Knudsen's nephew, Hans Peter Faye, drew up much of the plantation's design. Kekaha Sugar was initially seen as a shaky investment with a need for great amounts of capital to build an infrastructure of canals, pumps, water systems and other facilities needed to overcome its inherent physical disadvantages.  These pioneering years were rough ones for the growers who lacked an abundant water supply on Kauai. The plantation railroad was started in 1884.  Mules pulled the cane cars until 1886, when they were replaced with German-built locomotives.

Valdemar Knudsen forwarded birds to the Smithsonian Institution as early as 1866. Knudsen's efforts put Kauai ahead of the other Hawaiian islands in terms of ornithological knowledge for a time. He first collected the Kauaʻi ʻakialoa (Akialoa (ellisiana) stejnegeri). Leonhard Stejneger first described the species from a specimen collected by Valdemar Knudsen.  The Hawaiian stilt (Himantopus mexicanus knudseni) is named for him.

Knudsen was appointed by the King Kalākaua to a seat in the House of Nobles. Knudsen turned down the seat but served as an elected representative of the people in 1860. His knowledge of law and the fact that he spoke the 3 Hawaiian languages fluently  suited him for office. Knudsen  also served as a member of the House of Representatives under the Monarchy and joined the Provisional Government after Queen Liliuokalani was deposed in 1893.

Personal life

During  February 1867, Knudsen married Anne McHutcheson Sinclair, with whom he had five children: Ida, Augustus, Maud, Eric and Arthur, born between 1868 and 1875.   Following his death, there were claims of allegedly illegitimate children which resulted in failed attempts of taking over the Kekaha Sugar Company.
Valdemar Knudsen was known to the Hawaiians as Kanuka. In 1945, his son Eric Alfred Knudsen published Kanuka of Kauai, a book on the life of his father, as well as the Hawaiian natives who befriended him.

References

Other sources
 Gripsland, Torbjorn (2004) Forgotten Norwegians in Hawaii (emgirantforlaget)
Knudsen, Eric A. and Gurre P. Noble (1945) Kanuka of Kaua‘i: The Story of a True Pioneer  (Mutual Publishing)
Mills, Peter R. (2002) Hawaii's Russian Adventure: A New Look at Old History  (University of Hawaii Press)    
Moe, Jon (1975)  Akamai: Sagaen om den norske utvandring til Hawaii (Gyldendal) 

Stejneger, Leonhard Hess   (1887) Birds of Kauai Island, Hawaiian Archipelago collected by Mr. Valdemar Knudsen (Washington: Smithsonian Institution)
Wilcox, Carol (1998) Sugar Water (University of Hawaii Press)

External links
Valdemar Knudsen and Anne Sinclair Knudsen

1819 births
1898 deaths
People from Kristiansand
Agriculture in Hawaii
Businesspeople from Hawaii
Norwegian emigrants to the United States
Norwegian emigrants to the Hawaiian Kingdom
Members of the Hawaiian Kingdom House of Representatives
19th-century American businesspeople